The 1884 United States presidential election in Mississippi took place on November 4, 1884, as part of the 1884 United States presidential election. Voters chose 9 representatives, or electors to the Electoral College, who voted for president and vice president.

Mississippi voted for the Democratic candidate, New York Governor Grover Cleveland over the Republican candidate, former Secretary of State James G. Blaine. Cleveland won Mississippi by a margin of 28.68%.

Results

References

Mississippi
1884
1884 Mississippi elections